is a Japanese swimmer. He competed in the men's 4 × 100 metre freestyle relay event at the 2016 Summer Olympics. He qualified to represent Japan at the 2020 Summer Olympics.

References

External links
 

1994 births
Living people
Olympic swimmers of Japan
Swimmers at the 2016 Summer Olympics
Swimmers at the 2020 Summer Olympics
Universiade medalists in swimming
Asian Games medalists in swimming
Asian Games gold medalists for Japan
Asian Games silver medalists for Japan
Medalists at the 2014 Asian Games
Medalists at the 2018 Asian Games
Swimmers at the 2014 Asian Games
Swimmers at the 2018 Asian Games
Sportspeople from Tokyo
Medalists at the 2013 Summer Universiade
Medalists at the 2017 Summer Universiade
Japanese male freestyle swimmers
Universiade silver medalists for Japan
21st-century Japanese people